is a Japanese animation studio founded by ex-Gonzo producer Tōyō Ikeda and anime director Fumitoshi Oizaki in August 5, 2008. The studio is based in Nerima, Tokyo.



Works

Television series

Original net animations

Original video animations

Notes

References

External links

  
 

 
Animation studios in Tokyo
Japanese animation studios
Japanese companies established in 2008
Mass media companies established in 2008
Nerima